Vereaux is a commune in the Cher department in the Centre-Val de Loire region of France.

Geography

Population

Sights
 The church of St. Martin, dating from the twelfth century.
 Traces of a feudal castle.

See also
Communes of the Cher department

References

External links

Annuaire Mairie website 

Communes of Cher (department)